Bolton Corporation Tramways operated a tramway service in Bolton between 1899 and 1947.

History

The Corporation took over the Bolton Horse Tramways and the tramway assets of Edmund Holden and Company in June 1899, and undertook a programme of modernisation and electrification.

The first electric services ran on routes to Great Lever, Toothill Bridge and Tonge Moor 9 December 1899. On 2 January 1900 electric services started on routes to Halliwell, Dunscar, Moses Gate, Daubhill, Deane, Lostock and Doffcocker.

Extensions took place as follows:
13 April 1900 - Moses Gate route was extended to Farnworth (Black Horse), the Lostock route to Horwich and the Deane route to Hulton Lane.
19 May 1900 - Lee Lane section in Horwich 
21 December 1900 - Deane route extended to Chip Hill Road.
19 July 1904-  Daubhill service extended to Four Lane Ends. 
18 March 1905 - Toothill Bridge line extended to Breightmet 
 6 May 1910 - the Darcy Lever tramway 
4 May 1911 - Brownlow Fold section 
8 June 1923 - Chorley Old Road service extended from Doffcocker to Montserrat
26 October 1923 - Swan Lane extension.
11 April 1924 – Brownlow Fold route extension from Elgin Street to Church Road 
19 December 1924 Deane service extended to Westhoughton.

Fleet
1-40 Electric Railway and Tramway Carriage Works 1899
41-49 Electric Railway and Tramway Carriage Works 1900
50-59 Electric Railway and Tramway Carriage Works 1901
60-81 Electric Railway and Tramway Carriage Works 1902
82-86 Electric Railway and Tramway Carriage Works 1903
87-96 Brush Electrical Engineering Company 1906
97-103 Brush Electrical Engineering Company 1910
104-106 United Electric Car Company 1911
107-112 United Electric Car Company 1912
113-120 English Electric 1919
121-130 English Electric 1923
131-138 Brush Electrical Engineering Company 1906 (second hand from Sunderland Corporation Tramways)

Closure

The final tram service operated on 29 March 1947. Car 66 survives and is preserved on the Blackpool Tramway.

References

External links
 Bolton Corporation Tramways at the British Tramway Company Badges and Buttons website.

Tram transport in England
History of Bolton
Transport in the Metropolitan Borough of Bolton
Historic transport in Lancashire